Lim June-Hee (임준희, 1959, Oct. 10~) is a South Korean woman composer and professor at Korea National University of Arts. Her opera The Wedding (이쁜이의 혼례) premiered in Beijing in 2012.

References

South Korean opera composers
1959 births
Living people
South Korean women